Armando León Reséndez (born 18 January 2000) is a Mexican professional footballer who plays as a forward for Liga de Expansión MX club Oaxaca.

Career statistics

Club

Notes

Honours
León
Liga MX: Guardianes 2020
Leagues Cup: 2021

References

External links

Living people
2000 births
Mexican footballers
Club León footballers
Liga MX players
Association football forwards
People from Ensenada, Baja California
Footballers from Baja California